Balatajan Rural District is a rural district (dehestan) in the Central District of Qaem Shahr County, Mazandaran Province, Iran. At the 2006 census, its population was 31,892, in 8,244 families. The rural district has 50 villages.

References 

Rural Districts of Mazandaran Province
Qaem Shahr County